The Black River Group is a geologic group in Illinois and West Virginia. It preserves fossils dating back to the Ordovician period.

See also

 List of fossiliferous stratigraphic units in Illinois
 List of fossiliferous stratigraphic units in West Virginia

References
 

Geologic groups of Illinois
Ordovician West Virginia